Bijainagar railway station is a railway station in Ajmer district, Rajasthan. Its code is BJNR. It serves Bijainagar town. The station consists of 2 platforms. Passenger, Express, and Superfast trains halt here.

References

Railway stations in Ajmer district
Ajmer railway division